Edward Marvin "Big Ed" Reulbach (December 1, 1882 – July 17, 1961) was a Major League Baseball pitcher for the Chicago Cubs during their glory years of the early 1900s.

Career
Reulbach played college baseball at the University of Notre Dame in 1903 and 1904. He played for the University of Vermont in 1905, accumulating a 4-0 record before signing a contract with the Chicago Cubs in May.

In the 1906 World Series (ultimately won in six games by the Chicago White Sox), Reulbach shone in Game 2 at South Side Park, giving up only one hit, a seventh-inning single to Jiggs Donahue. This rare World Series low-hit game (there have only been five in the 100-plus years of the Series) was matched by fellow Cubs star Claude Passeau in 1945 when he threw just the second one-hitter in Series history, surpassed by Don Larsen's perfect game in Game 5 of the 1956 World Series.

Reulbach's best year was 1908, when he won 24 games for the National League and World Series champion Cubs, their last Series championship until they won it again in 2016. He pitched two shutouts in one day against the Brooklyn Dodgers on September 26, 1908. No other pitcher has ever accomplished this feat in the major leagues.

In a 1976 Esquire magazine article, sportswriter Harry Stein published an "All Time All-Star Argument Starter", consisting of five ethnic baseball teams. Reulbach was the right-handed pitcher on Stein's Jewish team, though Reulbach was, in fact, Roman Catholic and is buried in Montclair, New Jersey's Immaculate Conception Roman Catholic Cemetery.

He died in 1961 on the same day (July 17) as Ty Cobb and was buried in Immaculate Conception Cemetery, Montclair. Reulbach was the last surviving Chicago Cub to have played in the 1907 and 1908 World Series, their most recent world championship until 2016.

See also
 List of Major League Baseball career ERA leaders
 List of Major League Baseball career WHIP leaders
 List of Major League Baseball career shutout leaders
 List of Major League Baseball career hit batsmen leaders

References

External links

The Deadball Era

1882 births
1961 deaths
Major League Baseball pitchers
Chicago Cubs players
Brooklyn Dodgers players
Brooklyn Robins players
Newark Peppers players
Boston Braves players
Sedalia Goldbugs players
Providence Grays (minor league) players
Notre Dame Fighting Irish baseball players
Vermont Catamounts baseball players
Baseball players from Detroit
American Roman Catholics